Lawrence Amar (February 24, 1972 – January 21, 2020) was a field hockey midfielder from the United States, who was the captain of the national team that finished twelfth at the 1996 Summer Olympics in Atlanta, Georgia. Amar also earned two consecutive USA Field Hockey Athlete of the Year awards in 1994 and 1995.

Following his playing career, Amar served for six years in the United States Army, earning the rank of Staff Sergeant in the Infantry. He earned two Army Commendation and Army Achievement Medals. He returned home to be the assistant field hockey coach for the Kent State University team from 2009 to 2018. He then went on to assist with U.S. national team.

Born in Camarillo, California, he died at the age of 47 in 2020.

References

External links
 
 USA Field Hockey Athletes of the Year
 Kent State Mourns the Passing of Larry Amar

1972 births
Field hockey players at the 1996 Summer Olympics
2020 deaths
People from Camarillo, California
American male field hockey players
Pan American Games bronze medalists for the United States
Male field hockey midfielders
Pan American Games medalists in field hockey
Sportspeople from Ventura County, California
Field hockey players at the 1995 Pan American Games
Olympic field hockey players of the United States
Medalists at the 1995 Pan American Games